Torc Waterfall is a  high,  long cascade waterfall formed by the Owengarriff River as it drains from the Devil's Punchbowl corrie lake at Mangerton Mountain. The waterfall is a popular site on the Ring of Kerry and the Kerry Way tours.

Naming

The word Torc is from the Irish translation of a "wild boar", and the area is associated with legends involving wild boars.  One legend is of a man who was cursed by the Devil to spend each night transformed into a wild boar, but when his secret was revealed by a local farmer, he burst into flames and disappeared into the nearby Devils Punchbowl on Mangerton Mountain from which the Owengarriff River emerged to hide the entrance to his cave beneath the Torc Waterfall.  There is also the story of how the legendary Irish warrior, Fionn MacCumhaill, killed a magical boar on Torc mountain with his golden spear.

Geology

The 20 meters high waterfall is formed by the Owengarriff River as it drains from the Devil's Punchbowl lough, a deep cirque high above in Mangerton Mountain.

Torc Waterfall sits on a geological fault called the Muckross to Millstreet Fault Line. Torc Mountain consists of 400 million-year-old Devonian Old Red Sandstone, but the base around Muckross Lake is circa 100 million years younger and consists of Carboniferous Limestone.  At some stage, after the limestone was deposited, a period of tectonic-plate collision occurred and the land under Torc was lifted up 3,000 metres, re-exposing the underlying older sandstone.

Visiting

The cascade is one of the main points on the  Kerry Way walking tour, and a popular stop-off location on the larger Ring of Kerry tour. 

The waterfalls are a 200 metre walk from the car park (at ) just off the N71 road, and the climb to the top of the waterfalls is by way of a stone path of about a hundred steps (and circa 55 metres in elevation gain), and takes around 30 minutes to complete.  Red deer are frequently seen and heard in the area.

Killarney National Park has a number of loop-trails around the Torc Waterfall of varying lengths, called the Blue, Yellow and Red Trails.  The Red Trail climbs Cardiac Hill (also called Huntsman's Hill or the Cardiac Steps), and involves climbing a very steep series of stone steps (the starting point is half a kilometre west of the waterfall car-park off the N71) to an observation point and stone beehive hut, half-way up Torc Mountain at circa , giving views of the Lakes of Killarney, and then looping back eastwards to join the Old Kenmare Road and descend via Torc Waterfall.

A marked hiking trail also runs from the waterfall to the top of Torc Mountain  via the Old Kenmare Road, however, hikers can avoid Torc Waterfall and start from the upper car-park above the waterfall (at 55 metres), to complete the 8–kilometre 3 hour route to the summit of Torc Mountain and back.

See also

 Ladies View
 Moll's Gap
 Black Valley
 Gap of Dunloe

References

External links
Torc Waterfall on Tourism Ireland website or this  guide.

Tourist attractions in County Kerry
Landforms of County Kerry
Killarney
Waterfalls of the Republic of Ireland
Parks in County Kerry